Súria is a municipality in the comarca of the Bages in Catalonia, Spain. It is situated in the valley of the Cardener river between Manresa and Cardona. The area is best known for its deposits of potassium salts, which are exploited commercially and exported with trucks directly to all around the European continent or served to Martorell to receive chemical treatment by a dedicated railway line (there are passenger rail services between Martorell and Manresa, but there are none between Manresa and Súria, separated only by 14.3 km of distance). The Old Town, at the foot of the castle, has preserved much of its medieval structure. The municipality is linked to Manresa and to Cardona and Solsona by the C-1410 road.

Demography

References

 Panareda Clopés, Josep Maria; Rios Calvet, Jaume; Rabella Vives, Josep Maria (1989). Guia de Catalunya, Barcelona: Caixa de Catalunya.  (Spanish).  (Catalan).

External links
Official website 
 Government data pages 

Municipalities in Bages